Amato Ferrari (born 18 April 1966) is an Italian former auto racing driver. After competing in national events in Italy and Great Britain, he retired from racing in 1994 at the relatively young age of 28. Staying in motorsport, he switched to the management side of the sport. He is currently team principal of his own AF Corse team.

Racing record

Complete British Touring Car Championship results
(key) (Races in bold indicate pole position in class) (Races in italics indicate fastest lap in class)

References

External links
 www.afcorse.it Official website
 

1966 births
Living people
Italian racing drivers
British Touring Car Championship drivers
Sports car racing team owners